Rumbo can refer to:

 Rumbo (Texas Newspapers), a chain of Spanish newspapers published in San Antonio, Houston,  Austin, and McAllen, Texas.
Rumbo (film), a 1949 Spanish film
 Rumbo (newspaper), a free weekly bilingual newspaper published in Lawrence, Massachusetts
 Rumbo Submarino, the 2nd studio album by band Macaco
 Rumbo, a character used in several novels by  James Herbert